Guillermo Clavero (10 August 1921 – 15 April 2000) was a Chilean footballer. He played in six matches for the Chile national football team in 1945. He was also part of Chile's squad for the 1945 South American Championship.

References

External links
 

1921 births
2000 deaths
Chilean footballers
Chile international footballers
Place of birth missing
Association football midfielders
Everton de Viña del Mar footballers